Miloslava "Míla" Holubová (born 2 October 1949) is a Czech former professional tennis player.

Holubová made a surprise run to the final eight of the 1976 French Open, with wins over Maria Bueno, Gail Lovera and Wendy Turnbull. She was beaten in the quarter-finals by Virginia Ruzici.

References

External links
 

1949 births
Living people
Czechoslovak female tennis players
Czech female tennis players